Sangria is a drink.  It may also refer to:

Books
 Sangria: A Recipe for Love, novel by Manuela Requena

Music
 "Sangria" by Blake Shelton
"Sangria" by Tania Maria Composed by Tania Maria
"Sweet Sangria" by Tori Amos Composed by Tori Amos
"Sangria" by IQ
"Sangria Wine" by Jerry Jeff Walker
"Sangria Wine" by Pharrell Williams and Camila Cabello

Other
Another term for exsanguination.